The year 1928 in science and technology involved some significant events, listed below.

Anthropology
 American anthropologist Margaret Mead publishes Coming of Age in Samoa, "a psychological study of primitive youth for Western civilization".

Archaeology
 The old Canaanite city of Ugarit is rediscovered.

Biology
 January – Frederick Griffith reports the results of Griffith's experiment, indirectly proving the existence of DNA.
 September 3 – Alexander Fleming, at St Mary's Hospital, London, accidentally rediscovers the antibiotic Penicillin, forgotten since Ernest Duchesne's original discovery in 1896.
 American biogerontologist Raymond Pearl publishes his Rate of Living Hypothesis, proposing that lifespan is shorter in animals with faster metabolisms.

Chemistry 
 The Diels-Alder reaction is first described by German chemists Otto Diels and Kurt Alder.
 Bubble gum is invented by Walter Diemer in the United States.

Computer science
 April – Leslie Comrie publishes an article "On the Construction of Tables by Interpolation", describing the use of punched card equipment for interpolating tables of data, and becomes the first to use such equipment for scientific calculations, using Fourier synthesis to compute the principal terms in the motion of the Moon for 1935–2000.

History of science
 Florian Cajori begins publication of A History of Mathematical Notations.

Mathematics
 David Hilbert and Wilhelm Ackermann publish Grundzüge der theoretischen Logik, a pioneering elementary text in first-order logic stating the Entscheidungsproblem.
 John von Neumann publishes Zur Theorie der Gesellschaftsspiele, a text in game theory.

Medicine
 October 12 – An 'iron lung' medical ventilator designed by Philip Drinker and Louis Agassiz Shaw, Jr., is used for the first time, at Boston Children's Hospital in the United States for treatment of poliomyelitis.
 Dementia pugilistica is first described by forensic pathologist Dr. Harrison Stanford Martland, chief medical examiner of Essex County, New Jersey.

Physics
 February 28 – C. V. Raman and K. S. Krishnan discover Raman scattering in liquids.
 Paul Dirac proposes the Dirac equation as a relativistic equation of motion for the wavefunction of the electron, leading him to predict the existence of the positron, the electron's antiparticle.

Technology
 February 8 – British inventor John Logie Baird broadcasts a transatlantic television signal from London to Hartsdale, New York.
 June 11 – Hungarian inventor Kálmán Tihanyi files patents in Germany, the United Kingdom and France for a cathode ray television transmission system.
 July 3
 British inventor John Logie Baird demonstrates the world's first color television transmission, using scanning discs.
 Ulster-born engineer Harry Ferguson obtains a British patent for his three-point linkage for tractors.
 July 7 – The first machine-sliced and machine-wrapped loaf of bread is sold in Chillicothe, Missouri, using Otto Frederick Rohwedder's technology.
 September 3 – Philo Farnsworth demonstrates to the Press the world's first working all-electronic television system, employing electronic scanning in both the pickup and display devices.
 December – Completion of the Maurzyce Bridge near Łowicz in central Poland, the world's first road bridge of wholly welded construction, designed by Stefan Bryła.
 The concrete pump is invented by German Max Giese.
 Magnetic tape is invented by German Fritz Pfleumer.

Publications
 Arthur Eddington publishes the popular text The Nature of the Physical World in the United Kingdom, including a statement of the infinite monkey theorem.

Awards
 Nobel Prizes
 Physics – Owen Willans Richardson
 Chemistry – Adolf Otto Reinhold Windaus
 Medicine – Charles Jules Henri Nicolle

Births
 January 4 – Henry T. Lynch, American cancer geneticist.
 January 12 – Gerald Russell (died 2018), British psychiatrist.
 January 14 – Hans Kornberg, German-English biochemist (died 2019)
 February 14 – Sergey Kapitsa, Russian physicist and demographer (died 2018)
 February 18 – John Ostrom (died 2005), American paleontologist.
 March 8 – Gerald Bull (killed 1990), Canadian ballistics engineer.
 March 28 – Alexander Grothendieck (died 2014), German-born French mathematician, pioneer of modern algebraic geometry.
 April 6 – James Watson, American geneticist.
 April 20 – Charles David Keeling (died 2005), American atmospheric chemist, geochemist and oceanographer.
 April 29 – Heinz Wolff (died 2017), German-born British bioengineer and science populariser.
 May 2 – Hans Trass, Estonian ecologist and botanist (died 2017) 
 May 4 – Bill Mollison (died 2016), Australian biologist, pioneer of permaculture.
 May 23 – Jean E. Sammet (died 2017), American computer programmer.
 May 26 – Jack Kevorkian (died 2011), American pathologist, advocate of euthanasia.
 June 13 – John Forbes Nash, Jr. (died 2015), American mathematician, winner of the Nobel Memorial Prize in Economic Sciences.
 June 25 – Alexei Alexeyevich Abrikosov, Russian physicist, Nobel Prize laureate (died 2017)
 July 12 – Elias James Corey, American chemist, Nobel Prize laureate
 July 23 – Vera Rubin, née Cooper (died 2016), American astronomer.
 August 25 – Herbert Kroemer, German-born physicist, Nobel Prize laureate
 September 7 – Donald Henderson (died 2016), American epidemiologist.
 October 7 – Lorna Wing, née Tolchard (died 2014), English psychiatrist.
 October 25 – Peter Naur (died 2016), Danish data scientist.
 October 26 – Erich Kukk (died 2017), Estonian phycologist and conservationist
 October 30 – Daniel Nathans, American microbiologist, recipient of the Nobel Prize in Physiology or Medicine (died 1999)
 November 22 – Bill Chaloner (died 2016), English palaeobotanist.
 November 28 – Tove Birkelund (died 1986), Danish historical geologist.
 December 26 – Martin Cooper, American "father of the mobile phone".
 Wu Xinzhi, Chinese paleoanthropologist.

Deaths
 February 4 – Hendrik Lorentz (born 1853), Dutch physicist and Nobel laureate.
 February 5 - Xavier Arnozan (born 1852), French physician.
 February 8 – Theodor Curtius, German chemist (born 1857)
 March 19 
 David Ferrier (born 1843), Scottish-born neurologist.
 Emil Wiechert, German physicist and geophysicist (born 1861)
 March 21 – E. Walter Maunder (born 1851), English astronomer.
 April 2 – Theodore William Richards, American chemist, Nobel Prize laureate (born 1868)
 May 21 – Hideyo Noguchi (born 1876), Japanese bacteriologist.
 August 30 – Wilhelm Wien (born 1864), German physicist.
 October 29 – John Macintyre (born 1857), Scottish laryngologist and pioneer radiographer.

References

 
20th century in science
1920s in science